Der Weibsteufel may refer to:

 A Devil of a Woman or Der Weibsteufel, a 1951 Austrian film
 Der Weibsteufel (1966 film), an Austrian film